The 2022 Ruoff Mortgage 500 was the fourth stock car race of the 2022 NASCAR Cup Series and the 18th running of the event. The race was held on Sunday, March 13, 2022, in Avondale, Arizona at Phoenix Raceway, a  permanent low-banked tri-oval race track. The race took the scheduled 312 laps to complete. At race's end, Chase Briscoe, driving for Stewart-Haas Racing, pulled away on the final restart with three laps to go to capture his first career NASCAR Cup Series win and his first of the season. To fill out the top 3, Ross Chastain of the Trackhouse Racing Team and Tyler Reddick of Richard Childress Racing would finish second and third, respectively.

Report

Background

The motorsport track opened in 1964 and currently hosts two NASCAR race weekends annually. PIR has also hosted the IndyCar Series, CART, USAC and the Rolex Sports Car Series. The raceway is currently owned and operated by International Speedway Corporation.

The raceway was originally constructed with a 2.5 mi (4.0 km) road course that ran both inside and outside of the main tri-oval. In 1991 the track was reconfigured with the current 1.51 mi (2.43 km) interior layout. PIR has an estimated grandstand seating capacity of around 67,000. Lights were installed around the track in 2004 following the addition of a second annual NASCAR race weekend.

Entry list
 (R) denotes rookie driver.
 (i) denotes driver who is ineligible for series driver points.

Practice

Practice results

Qualifying

Qualifying results

Race

Stage Results

Stage One
Laps: 60

Stage Two
Laps: 125

Final Stage Results

Stage Three
Laps: 127

Race statistics
 Lead changes: 14 among 6 different drivers
 Cautions/Laps: 8 for 52
 Red flags: 0
 Time of race: 3 hours, 6 minutes and 34 seconds
 Average speed:

Media

Television
Fox Sports covered their 17th race at the Phoenix Raceway. Mike Joy, Clint Bowyer, and Danica Patrick called the race from the broadcast booth. Jamie Little and Regan Smith handled pit road, while Larry McReynolds provided insight from the Fox Sports studio in Charlotte.

Radio
MRN covered the radio action for the race which was also simulcasted on Sirius XM NASCAR Radio. Alex Hayden and Jeff Striegle called the race when the field raced past the start/finish line. Dan Hubbard called the action from turns 1 & 2, and Kyle Rickey called the action from turns 3 & 4. Pit lane was manned by Steve Post and Jason Toy.

Standings after the race

Drivers' Championship standings

Manufacturers' Championship standings

Note: Only the first 16 positions are included for the driver standings.

References

2022 in sports in Arizona
2022 NASCAR Cup Series
March 2022 sports events in the United States
NASCAR races at Phoenix Raceway